Niyogi Brahmin is a Telugu Brahmin subcaste native to the Indian States of Andhra Pradesh and Telangana, but are spread throughout South India and Maharashtra. The traditional occupations of the Niyogi Brahmins are settled cultivation and priest hood. But majority of them took up various secular vocations including military activities and patwaris. They were associated with administration, economics, literature, music composing, politics, scholarly, scientific, engineering, defense and warfare careers.

Etymology
The word Niyogi is derived from Yoga, which in this context means "religious contemplation", as opposed to Yaga, which means "religious sacrifice". Niyogin in Sanskrit also means "employed", "appointed" or "assigned" and it is probable that Niyogis were given this name because they accept secular employment.

See also
 Telugu Brahmin

References

Further reading 

Telugu Brahmin communities
Social groups of Andhra Pradesh
Social groups of Telangana